Sérgio Jimenez (born May 15, 1984, in Piedade, São Paulo State) is a Brazilian racing driver currently competing with Scuderia Chiarelli in the Stock Car Pro Series. He is the 2002 Formula Renault 2.0 Brazil champion, and the 2018-19 Jaguar I-Pace eTrophy champion.

Career
He started his career in 1994 with karting and in 2002 participated in the Formula Renault Brazilian Championship, which he won.  In 2006 he participated in the Spanish Formula Three Championship.  Jimenez drove five races for Racing Engineering in the 2007 GP2 Series season before being dropped in favor of Ernesto Viso after the 2007 Monaco Grand Prix. He drove also for A1 Team Brazil in the 2007-08 A1 Grand Prix season.

Racing record

Career summary

Complete GP2 Series results
(key) (Races in bold indicate pole position) (Races in italics indicate fastest lap)

Complete A1 Grand Prix results

GT1 World Championship results

Complete Stock Car Brasil results

Complete Jaguar I-Pace eTrophy results
(key) (Races in bold indicate pole position)

References

External links
 Official website (in Portuguese and English)
 

1984 births
Living people
Sportspeople from São Paulo (state)
Brazilian people of Spanish descent
Brazilian Formula Renault 2.0 drivers
Brazilian racing drivers
British Formula Renault 2.0 drivers
A1 Team Brazil drivers
GP2 Series drivers
Brazilian GP2 Series drivers
FIA GT1 World Championship drivers
Stock Car Brasil drivers
Blancpain Endurance Series drivers
24 Hours of Spa drivers
Manor Motorsport drivers
Racing Engineering drivers
W Racing Team drivers
A1 Grand Prix drivers
Karting World Championship drivers